Northern Border or North Border may refer to:

 Mexico–United States border, the international border between Mexico and the United States
 Canada–United States border, the international border between Canada and the United States
 Northern Border (film), a 1953 Mexican crime film